Neuropeptide Y receptor type 5 is a protein that in humans is encoded by the NPY5R gene.

Selective ligands

Agonists 
 Neuropeptide Y (endogenous agonist, non subtype selective)
 BWX-46 (selective NPY5 agonist, CAS# 172997-92-1)
 Peptide YY

Antagonists 
 CGP-71683 (CAS# 192322-50-2)
 FMS-586
 L-152,804 (CAS# 6508-43-6)
 Lu AA-33810
 MK-0557
 NTNCB (CAS# 486453-65-0)
 Velneperit (S-2367)

See also 
 Neuropeptide Y receptor

References

Further reading

External links 
 

G protein-coupled receptors